Aldridge Peak is a  peak on the ridge between Hearfield Glacier and Trafalgar Glacier in the Victory Mountains, situated on the Borchgrevink Coast, named for Anglo-Norwegian explorer Carsten Borchgrevink (1864–1934), Victoria Land, Antarctica. The peak was mapped by the United States Geological Survey from surveys and U.S. Navy air photos in 1960–62 and named by the  Advisory Committee on Antarctic Names for James A. Aldridge, aviation machinist's mate with U.S. Navy Squadron VX-6 at McMurdo Station, 1967.

References

Mountains of Victoria Land
Borchgrevink Coast